Eric Pearce (1936–1997) was an English Paralympic athlete, who represented Great Britain at the 1984 Summer Paralympics.

Biography
Pearce was born in Nottingham. After leaving school, he went to work at Gedling Colliery before joining the RAF. Eric spent 12 years in the RAF during which he was stationed in Cypress, Singapore, Darlington and the Isle of Man.

After leaving the RAF he returned to work at Gedling Colliery. During this time, he was involved in an accident whereby a roof collapsed on him, injuring his back and leaving him hospitalised for several months. He was unable to work again because he had trouble walking and was reliant on a wheelchair.

After the incident, he began helping disabled children with sports. He also started to train himself to have something to focus on. Eventually, he was offered a place on the team to represent Great Britain at the 1984 Summer Paralympics in New York City.

Soon after, he had a mild heart attack whilst on holiday in Las Vegas, ending his sporting career.

Pearce died on 31 March 1997 from pancreatic cancer. He was 61 years old.

References

1936 births
1997 deaths
Royal Air Force airmen
20th-century Royal Air Force personnel
Military personnel from Nottingham
Sportspeople from Nottingham
Paralympic athletes of Great Britain
Athletes (track and field) at the 1984 Summer Paralympics
Medalists at the 1984 Summer Paralympics
Paralympic gold medalists for Great Britain
Paralympic silver medalists for Great Britain
Paralympic bronze medalists for Great Britain
Paralympic medalists in athletics (track and field)
British male discus throwers
British male javelin throwers
British male shot putters
Royal Air Force personnel
Deaths from pancreatic cancer
Paralympic discus throwers
Paralympic javelin throwers
Paralympic shot putters
Wheelchair discus throwers
Wheelchair javelin throwers
Wheelchair shot putters